Edward Newman Fuller (1888–1969) was an English sportsman who played rugby union at an international level, touring Argentina with the 1910 Combined British rugby union side, an early incarnation of the British & Irish Lions.

Early life
Edward Newman Fuller was born on 25 September 1888, in Billericay, Essex, the youngest son of George (a member of the stock exchange) and Maria L Lee. He attended Merchant Taylors School where he featured in the School first fifteen rugby squad in 1906–07, but where he was more noted for his prowess as a cricketer playing in the School XI in 1903, 1904, 1905, 1906 (as captain) and 1907 (as captain). He left school in 1907 and became a scholar of Madgalen College Cambridge.

Rugby union
Fuller played his rugby for his school's old boys club, Old Merchant Taylors' and was captain of the OMTFC in 1910-11 and 1911–12. Although he was never selected to play rugby for England, he was selected to tour with the Combined British on the 1910 tour to Argentina where he played in what Argentina count as their first test match.

Career and later life
In the First World War he joined the Royal Flying Corps. He served in France and Egypt amongst other theatres. On 25 January 1913 he became a Second Lieutenant, and eventually became a major during the war. On 21 March, at Jesmond Parish Church, the now Lieutenant-Colonel Edward Newman Fuller, R.F.C., was married to Dorothy Kate, the eldest daughter of Mr. and Mrs. James Legg, of Paul's Dean, Salisbury. He died in September 1969 in Hailsham, Sussex, England.

References

Photo taken on 15 October 1912 contained within: Royal Aero Club. Royal Aero Club index cards and photographs are in the care of the Royal Air Force Museum, Hendon, London, England.

1888 births
1969 deaths
British & Irish Lions rugby union players from England
English rugby union players
Rugby union centres
Rugby union players from London
Rugby union wings